Azerbaijan national field hockey team may refer to:
 Azerbaijan men's national field hockey team
 Azerbaijan women's national field hockey team